Swarnavigraham is a 1974 Indian Malayalam-language film, directed and produced by Mohan Gandhiraman. The film stars Jayabharathi, Adoor Bhasi, Sreelatha Namboothiri and Raghavan. The film had musical score by M. B. Sreenivasan.

Cast
Jayabharathi
Adoor Bhasi
Sreelatha Namboothiri
Raghavan
Khadeeja
Rani Chandra
Sadhana
Vincent

Soundtrack
The music was composed by M. B. Sreenivasan and the lyrics were written by Mankombu Gopalakrishnan and Thikkurissy Sukumaran Nair.

References

External links
 

1974 films
1970s Malayalam-language films